Lord Chamberlain of the Archduchess was a ceremonial function at the imperial court of Brussels.

This position was given to important members of the Nobility of Brabant and Flanders, in service of Prince Charles Alexander of Lorraine and archduchess Maria Christina, imperial governess of the Habsburg Netherlands.

Lord Grand Chamberlains in Imperials Service 
 1751-1756: Eugène-Hyacinthe de Lannoy, 5th Count of la Motterie: Grand Marshall and Lord Grand Chamberlain of the Imperial Court. 
 1756-1760: Maximilian Emanuel, 3rd Prince of Hornes
 1764-1773: Charles I Emmanuel, 1st Prince de Gavre; Grand Marshall and Lord Grand Chamberlain of the Imperial Court
 1775-1780: François I Joseph, 2nd Prince de Gavre; Grand Marshall and Lord Grand Chamberlain of the Imperial Court

Lord Chamberlains in Imperial Service

Princes
 The Prince of Béthune

Dukes
 the Duke of Arenbergh, (1751-1768)
 The Duke of Beauffort
 The Duke of Ursel: Charles, 2nd Duke d'Ursel

Marquesses
 The Marquess of Arconati, (1751-1772)
 The Marquess of Assche, (1755-1757) 
 The Marquess of Bournonville, (1745-1754)
 The Marquess of Deynze, (1745-1774)
 The Marquess of Ayseau.
 The Marquess of Herzelles, (1745-59)
 The Marquess of Hoensbroech, (1771-1772)
 The Marquess of Yves
 The Marquess of La Puente, (1767-1780)
 The Marquess of Laverne, (1745-1743)
 The Marquess of Rode, (1761-1766)
 The Marquess of Wemmel, (1766-1780)
 The Marquess of Westerloo, (1745-1770)
 The Marquess of Chasteler, (1763-1768)
 The Marquess of Ittres 
 The Marquess of Spontin

Counts

Barons 
 The Baron of Rommerswael
 The Baron of Inghelmunster
 The Baron of Seckendorff
 The Baron of Overijssche
 The Baron vander Gracht

Others 
 The lord of Brederode

References 

Court titles in the Ancien Régime
Austrian Netherlands
Lists of Belgian nobility
Courts and councils in the Burgundian and Habsburg Netherlands